Yousry Saber Hussein El-Gamal is a former Minister of Education for Egypt.
He was replaced on 3 January 2010 by Dr. Ahmed Zaki Badr.

References

 

1947 births
Living people
Education Ministers of Egypt